

The Carleton Light Infantry was an infantry regiment of the Non-Permanent Active Militia of the Canadian Militia (now the Canadian Army). In 1936, the regiment was Amalgamated with The York Regiment to form The Carleton and York Regiment.

Lineage

The Carleton Light Infantry 

 Originated on 10 September 1869, in Woodstock, New Brunswick, as The Carleton Light Infantry.
 Redesignated on 5 November 1869, as the 67th Battalion, The Carleton Light Infantry.
 Redesignated on 8 May 1900, as the 67th Regiment Carleton Light Infantry.
 Redesignated on 15 March 1920, as The Carleton Light Infantry.
 Amalgamated on 15 December 1936, with The York Regiment and Redesignated as The Carleton and York Regiment.

Perpetuations 

 104th Battalion, CEF

History

Early History 
On 10 September 1869, The Carleton Light Infantry was authorized for service with companies at Centreville, Richmond, Victoria, Waterville, Brighton and Woodstock.

On 5 November 1869, the unit was Redesignated as the 67th Battalion The Carleton Light Infantry.

On 8 May 1900, the 67th Battalion The Carleton Light Infantry was Redesignated as the 67th Regiment The Carleton Light Infantry.

The Great War 
On 6 August 1914, Details of the 67th Regiment, The Carleton Light Infantry were placed on active service for local protective duty.

On 22 December 1915, the 104th Battalion, CEF was authorized for service and on 28 June 1916, the battalion embarked for Great Britain. After its arrival in the UK, the battalion provided reinforcements for the Canadian Corps in the field. On 24 January 1917, the battalion's personnel were absorbed by the 105th Battalion (Prince Edward Island Highlanders), CEF. On 27 July 1918, the 104th Battalion, CEF was disbanded.

Alliances 

  - The Queen's Own Royal West Kent Regiment (Until 1936)

Battle Honours 

 Mount Sorrel
 Somme, 1916
 Ancre Heights
 Ancre, 1916
 Arras, 1917, ‘18
 Vimy, 1917
 Hill 70
 Ypres, 1917
 Passchendaele
 Amiens
 Scarpe, 1918
 Drocourt-Quéant
 Hindenburg Line
 Canal du Nord
 Valenciennes
 France and Flanders, 1916-18

Notable Members 

 Lieutenant Colonel William Teel Baird

References

Former infantry regiments of Canada
Light Infantry regiments of Canada
Carleton and York Regiment
Royal New Brunswick Regiment
Military units and formations of New Brunswick